John Otto John  (born 25 January 1998), commonly known as Otto John, is a Nigerian professional footballer who plays as a forward for Prishtina.

Club career

Skënderbeu Korçë
In December 2015, John joined Albanian Superliga side Skënderbeu Korçë.

Loan at Trepça'89

2015–16 season
In the 2015–16 season, John joined Football Superleague of Kosovo side Trepça'89, on a season-long loan and during that season, he played only 3 matches.

2016–17 season
John enjoyed a great form during the 2016–17 season, netting 26 goals in 33 matches. His performances throughout the year earned him league's top goalscorer award and a spot in 2016 Football Superleague of Kosovo's Team of the Year.

2017–18 season
John's first match for the 2017–18 season was a match in the framework of first qualifying round of 2017–18 UEFA Champions League and in that match he played after being named in the starting line-up. 

After Trepça '89 were eliminated from the UEFA Champions League, John continued to be part of the team, and during the 2017–18 season he scored 17 goals in 31 matches and was named the league's top goalscorer for the second time, together with Mirlind Daku of Llapi. On 27 June 2018, John left the club after his loan ended having scored 43 goals in 69 appearances in all competitions.

Return to Skënderbeu Korçë
On 9 July 2018, John returned to his parent club Skënderbeu Korçë, ahead of the 2018–19 season. On 12 August 2018, he won his first trophy as a Skënderbeu Korçë player, the 2018 Albanian Supercup as the team defeated Laçi 3–2 at the Elbasan Arena. John was an unused substitute in the match.

On 17 August 2018, John made his debut in a 1–0 home win in the opening week of the 2018–19 Albanian Superliga against Partizani Tirana after coming on as a late substitute in place of Blerim Krasniqi. In the second matchday versus newly-promoted side Kastrioti, he come on as a late substitute and assisted the third goal in a 3–0 victory.

On 12 September 2018, John scored his first goal for Skënderbeu Korçë in a 3–0 win against Veleçiku Koplik in the first round of Albanian Cup. His first Albanian Superliga goal came five days later in the 2–0 win at Flamurtari Vlorë, netting the second of the match eight minutes after coming on as a substitute.

Prishtina
On 8 January 2020, John joined Football Superleague of Kosovo side Prishtina. One month later, he made his debut with Prishtina in the quarter-final of 2019–20 Kosovar Cup against Vushtrria after being named in the starting line-up and scored two goals during a 4–1 home win.

International career

Because of his talent, there were numerous discussions about making John the first foreign player for the Kosovo national team. John said that would gladly accept an invitation from the coach Albert Bunjaki, although he would have to obtain a Kosovan passport in advance.

Personal life
John was born in Akwa Ibom, a one of Nigeria's 36 states to Nigerian parents. He stated that he grew up idolizing Didier Drogba due to his strength and Samuel Eto'o due to his goalscoring abilities.

The May 5, 2022, the player was arrested for human trafficking.

Career statistics

Club

Honours

Club
Skënderbeu Korçë
Albanian Supercup: 2018

Trepça'89
Football Superleague of Kosovo: 2016–17
Kosovar Supercup: 2017

Individual
Football Superleague of Kosovo top goalscorer: 2016–17, 2017–18
Football Superleague of Kosovo's Team of the Year: 2016

References

External links

Otto John at the Albanian Football Association

1998 births
Living people
Sportspeople from Akwa Ibom State
Association football forwards
Nigerian footballers
Nigerian expatriate footballers
Nigerian expatriate sportspeople in Albania
Nigerian expatriate sportspeople in Kosovo
KF Skënderbeu Korçë players
KF Trepça'89 players
Kategoria Superiore players
Football Superleague of Kosovo players
FC Prishtina players
Expatriate footballers in Kosovo
Expatriate footballers in Albania